Ancienne Douane ("Old Custom house"), also known as Koïfhus, is a Gothic and Renaissance building in Colmar, France. It is classified as a monument historique by the French Ministry of Culture since 1930. It is also the birthplace of general Jean Rapp.

The building currently houses a restaurant as well as temporary exhibitions and fairs.

Gallery

References

External links 
The Koïfhus or the former customs house on tourisme-colmar.com.

Buildings and structures in Colmar
Tourist attractions in Colmar
Gothic architecture in France
Buildings and structures completed in 1480
Custom houses
Monuments historiques of Haut-Rhin
Restaurants in France